Çamlıca is a village in Silifke district of Mersin Province, Turkey. The village is situated in the Taurus Mountains and on the road connecting Silifke to Gülnar. The population of Çamlıca   is 179 as of 2011.

References

Villages in Silifke District